The Bătarci is a left tributary of the river Batar in Romania and Ukraine. It discharges into the Batar in Kholmovets, Vynohradiv Raion.

References

Rivers of Romania
Rivers of Zakarpattia Oblast
Rivers of Satu Mare County